The national flag of Cape Verde (Portuguese: bandeira de Cabo Verde; Capeverdean (ALUPEC): bandera di Kauberdi) was adopted on 22 September 1992, replacing the flag adopted during Cape Verdean independence, fought for with Guinea-Bissau, another former Portuguese colony on mainland West Africa.

Description 

The National Flag of the Republic of Cape Verde has five unequal horizontal bands of blue, white, and red, with a circle of ten yellow five-pointed stars, all pointing upwards. The topmost blue stripe is half the height of the flag. Each of the three stripes of white and red are one twelfth of the height, and the bottom blue stripe is one quarter. Therefore, the height of the stripes are in a 6:1:1:1:3 ratio.

The lowest star is inscribed in an invisible circle centered at the middle of the lower blue stripe (that is, one eight of the height from the bottom). The size of this invisible circle (which determines the size of the stars) is not specified by the constitution, but it is commonly constructed with a diameter equal to 1/12 of the height of the flag.

Symbolism

The 10 stars on the flag represent the main islands of the nation (a chain of islands off the coast of West Africa). The blue represents the ocean and the sky. The band of white and red represents the road toward the construction of the nation, and its colours stand for peace (white) and effort (red). The circle of yellow stars on a dark blue field is similar to the flag of Europe (which has 12 stars instead of 10).

Proportions 

The Constitution of the Republic does not specify official proportions for the height and the width of the flag. The dimensions of the parts that make up the flag are given proportionally to the dimensions of the sides, without specifying the side dimensions. However, the proportion most widely used is 2:3, which is the same proportion that was used in the flag prior to 1992. Consequently, 2:3 is the de facto proportion, while 10:17 is the de jure proportion of the flag.

Colour shades 

The Boletim Oficial gives the official shades of the flag's colours (as well as the colours of the Arms of the Republic):

The Pantone, CMYK and RGB are official as published in the bulletin. The other colour shades (Web and HSV) are interpretations of the Pantone standards.

History 
Before independence from Portugal, Cape Verde did not have an official flag, and the Portuguese national flag was used. In the late 1960s, a flag for the Portuguese overseas province of Cape Verde was proposed, consisting of the flag of Portugal with the shield from the provincial arms added to the lower fly. However, this flag was never adopted.

The original national flag of Cape Verde was introduced on independence in 1975 and was based on the flag of the African Party for the Independence of Guinea and Cape Verde (PAIGC). It used the common African colours of red, green and yellow, and was identical to the flag of Guinea-Bissau except for the proportions and the charge in the hoist-side stripe. Their similarity evoked the plans to unite both countries, which were abandoned shortly after independence. Guinea-Bissau gained independence on 10 September 1974.

References 

Flag
Flags of Africa
Flags introduced in 1992
Cape Verde